Furbo or Furbogh (Na Forbacha in Irish) is a settlement with a population of around 300 in Connemara, County Galway, Ireland. It lies along the coast between Barna and Spiddal. It is a Gaeltacht area where Irish is the main language used in the school, church and at community meetings. The figure for those who self-report as speaking Irish daily is 39%. The headquarters of the Gaeltacht Authority, Údarás na Gaeltachta, is located in Na Forbacha.

It has a typical Gaeltacht style of settlement with no village street or centre, but rather comprises around fourteen townlands, most of which run north to south from the bog to the foreshore. Due to its proximity to Galway, and consequential pressure from property developers, housing developments generally have an Irish language clause applied. Housing developments have a requirement that 80% plus of housing units are reserved for Irish speakers.

The settlement consists of the following townlands: Cnocán an Bhodaigh, an Straidhp, an tSaoirsin, Baile na hAbhann, na Poillíní, Doire Uachtair, Aill an Phréacháin, an Coisméig Mór, na Forbacha Garbha, Seanadh Fhréachóg, and Cnoc na Gréine.

Furbo has a large community pitch which is used by the local Bearna-Na Forbacha hurling club, football club, and by the nearby Barna Soccer Club.

See also
 List of towns and villages in Ireland.

References

Towns and villages in County Galway
Gaeltacht places in County Galway
Gaeltacht towns and villages